A.S.D. Fersina Perginese is an Italian association football, and the major football club in Pergine Valsugana, Trentino-Alto Adige/Südtirol. Currently it plays in Italy's Serie D.

History

Foundation
The club was founded in 2009 after the merger with the teams of A.S. Fersina and A.C. Perginese.

Serie D
In the season 2011–12 the team was promoted from Eccellenza Trentino-Alto Adige/Südtirol to Serie D.

Colors and badge
The team's colors are yellow and black.

Honours
Eccellenza Trentino-Alto Adige/Südtirol:
 Winner (1): 2011–12
Regional Coppa Italia Trentino-Alto Adige/Südtirol:
Winner (2): 2010–11, 2011–12

References

External links
 Official website

Football clubs in Italy
Football clubs in Trentino
Association football clubs established in 2009
2009 establishments in Italy